Trinity Center Airport  is a public airport located in Trinity Center, serving Trinity County, California, USA. This general aviation airport covers 55 acres and has one runway.

References

External links 

Trinity Center Airport
North Trinity Lake area

Airports in Trinity County, California